José María Franco Bordóns (Irun, 1894–1971) was a Basque composer. He was one of the "músicos del '27."

References

Basque composers
1894 births
1971 deaths
20th-century composers
20th-century Spanish musicians